"There's a Moon Out Tonight" is a song originally released in 1958 by The Capris. The initial release on the Planet label saw very limited sales, and the Capris disbanded. In 1960, after a disk jockey played the song on air, the public interest in the song that was generated led to it being re-released on the Lost Nite label, and later that year the Old Town label. The group reunited shortly thereafter.

In early 1961, "There’s a Moon Out Tonight" spent 14 weeks on the Billboard Hot 100 chart peaking at No. 3, while reaching No. 11 on Billboards Hot R&B Sides, and No. 14 on Canada's CHUM Hit Parade.

The song was ranked No. 50 on Billboards end of year "Hot 100 for 1961 - Top Sides of the Year" and No. 51 on Cash Boxs "Top 100 Chart Hits of 1961".

Chart performance

References

1958 songs
1958 singles
1960 singles
Doo-wop songs